This is a list of flag bearers who have represented Slovakia at the Olympics.

Flag bearers carry the national flag of their country at the opening ceremony of the Olympic Games.

See also
Slovakia at the Olympics

References

Slovakia at the Olympics
Slovakia
Olympics